Ramesh Garg is currently a dean of student and alumni affairs in IIT Ropar. Previously he was a professor at the Indian Institute of Technology, Kharagpur (near Kolkata), India. Professor Garg is known for his work on microstrip antennas.

Recent publications
 A Broadband Coupled-Strips Microstrip Antenna by R. Garg and V. S. Reddy, IEEE Trans. Antenna & Prop., 49 (2001) 1344-1345 
 Microstrip Antenna Design Handbook by R. Garg, P, Bhartia, I. Bahl, and A. Ittipiboon.  Norwood:  Artech House. (2001)

Awards
 Fellow, IEEE (2002)
 Fellow, IETE 
 IETE Gowri Memorial Award for "Finite Difference Time 2000 Domain Analysis of Microwave Circuit (2002)

Member of editorial board
 Member : International J. of RF and Microwave Computer-aided Engineering

External links
 Indian Institute of Technology, Kharagpur, India 

Living people
Fellow Members of the IEEE
Year of birth missing (living people)